Peter Hoeltzenbein (born 7 April 1971 in Münster) is a German rower.

References

External links
 

1971 births
Living people
Sportspeople from Münster
Rowers at the 1992 Summer Olympics
Olympic silver medalists for Germany
Olympic rowers of Germany
Olympic medalists in rowing
German male rowers
World Rowing Championships medalists for Germany
Medalists at the 1992 Summer Olympics
20th-century German people